The Apulian regional election of 2000 took place on 16 April 2000.

Raffaele Fitto (Forza Italia) was elected President, defeating Giannicola Sinisi (Italian People's Party).

Results

Elections in Apulia
2000 elections in Italy